Kyvon Leidsman (born 3 September 1998) is a Dutch footballer who plays as a forward for Eerste Divisie club TOP Oss.

Career

Early career
Born in Amsterdam, Leidsman played in the youth of AFC and Heerenveen, before returning to AFC and subsequently moving to De Graafschap. At De Graafschap, he appeared for the reserve team, Jong Graafschap in the Derde Divisie Sunday from 2016 to 2018. For the 2018–19 season, Leidsman was promoted to the first team, where he sat on the bench four times in the Eredivisie. In November 2018, he left the club due to lack of playing time. He joined the reserve team of Almere City FC, Jong Almere City, where he played for a season and a half.

TOP Oss
On 31 July 2020, Leidsman signed a one-year contract with TOP Oss, where he made his professional debut in a 1–2 home loss to Helmond Sport on 29 August. He came on for Trevor David in the 57th minute. He scored his first goal on 5 October in a 2–0 win over Dordrecht. He subsequently scored three additional goals during the fall season – in wins over Den Bosch, Jong PSV and NEC – and grew into an important player in midfield for the club. His performances were rewarded on 2 December 2020, where he signed a two-year contract extension with TOP Oss.

Personal life
Born in the Netherlands, Leidsman is of Surinamese descent through this parents.

References

External links

1998 births
Living people
Dutch footballers
Dutch sportspeople of Surinamese descent
Association football forwards
Footballers from Amsterdam
De Graafschap players
TOP Oss players
Eerste Divisie players
Amsterdamsche FC players
SC Heerenveen players
Almere City FC players